Pickering Beach may refer to:

 Pickering Beach, Delaware, an unincorporated community in Kent County, Delaware, United States
 Pickering Beach, Ontario, a neighbourhood of Ajax in Ontario, Canada